Basil Charles King  (1915–1985) was a British geologist and author. He won the Geological Society of London’s Bigsby Medal for 1959.

Life
King was educated at King Edward VI School, Bury St Edmunds. He studied geology at Durham University, graduating in 1936 with first-class honours. He then worked as a demonstrator at Bedford College before moving to Africa as a member of the Uganda Geology Survey. He eventually returned to the United Kingdom as senior lecturer at Glasgow University.

He began lecturing in geology at Glasgow University and later received a professorship at Bedford College, London in 1956. In 1950 he was elected a Fellow of the Royal Society of Edinburgh. His proposers were Neville George, John Weir, George Walter Tyrrell, and Arthur Holmes.
He became a member of the Geological Society of London in 1949.

His health failing, King retired and moved to Arran. He died on 11 September 1985.

Family
He was married to Dorothy Margaret Wells in 1939.

Publications
The Geology of the Osi Area (1949)
The Napak Area of Southern Karamoja, Uganda (1949)
The Form of Beinn an Dubhaich Granite on Skye (1960)
The History of the Alkaline Volcanoes and Intrusive Complexes of  Eastern Uganda and Western Kenya (1969) co-written with Michael John Le Bas and Diana Stephanie Sutherland

References

1915 births
1985 deaths
20th-century British geologists
Fellows of the Royal Society of Edinburgh
Alumni of Hatfield College, Durham
20th-century non-fiction writers